The 1918 Lafayette football team was an American football team that represented Lafayette College as an independent during the 1918 college football season. In its first and only season under head coach Lewis A. Cobbett, the team compiled a 3–4 record. Grant Scott was the team captain.  The team played its home games at March Field in Easton, Pennsylvania.

Schedule

References

Lafayette
Lafayette Leopards football seasons
Lafayette football